Page Samuel McConnell (born May 17, 1963 in Philadelphia, Pennsylvania) is an American multi-instrumentalist, most noted for his work as the keyboardist and a songwriter for the band Phish.

In addition to having been a member of Phish since 1985, McConnell has been part of a number of other side projects, including leading the electronic jazz fusion band Vida Blue and acting as a session musician for the comedy rock duo Tenacious D. He released his debut solo album, Page McConnell, in 2007.

Background
McConnell was born in Philadelphia, Pennsylvania in 1963. By age four, he began to learn to play the piano, and in 1969 his family relocated to Basking Ridge, New Jersey. He continued his musical studies, eventually playing in bands with friends by seventh grade. His father, Dr. Jack B. McConnell, worked at McNeil Laboratories and helped to develop Tylenol and the MRI. The elder McConnell then started a free health clinic, Volunteers in Medicine, that is staffed by retired health workers in Hilton Head, South Carolina. Jack McConnell died in February 2018.

McConnell spent a year at Gill St. Bernard's School, in Gladstone, New Jersey before moving. McConnell spent his senior year of high school at Lawrence Academy, a boarding school in Groton, Massachusetts, and then attended Southern Methodist University from Fall 1982 to Spring 1984, where he joined Kappa Alpha Order and took a course called Imagination, Awareness, and Ideas taught by Donald Pasquella (based on Pasquella's 1974 paper called 'Imagination, Awareness, and Ideas: Helping The Student Become More Creative', which McConnell later credited in his Goddard College senior study as "the most important course I have ever taken." McConnell transferred to Goddard College in the fall of 1984 where he met his mentor, saxophonist Karl Boyle, and wrote his senior study, The Art of Improvisation under Boyle's guidance. In his senior study, McConnell credited music teacher, Doug Freuler, for introducing him to jazz improvisation, and pianist Lar Duggan as “single most important person in helping me develop my improvisation”. McConnell graduated from Goddard in December 1987.

McConnell joined Phish in 1985 and played with the band for the first time on May 3 of that year. McConnell has written a number of Phish originals including "Cars Trucks Buses," "Magilla," "Army of One," "I Been Around," "Windy City," "Halfway to the Moon," "If I Told You.", "Things People Do.", and "I Always Wanted It This Way". He has also coauthored numerous other songs with the band.

Other musical projects
In 1997, McConnell played keyboards on the title track of Scottish band Travis' debut album Good Feeling. The album was produced by Steve Lillywhite, who had produced Phish's Billy Breathes album in 1996. In early 2001, McConnell recorded with Tenacious D on their debut album, later joining the band onstage that September for a show at the Higher Ground nightclub in Winooski, Vermont. That same year, with Oteil Burbridge and Russell Batiste, McConnell was a founding member of Vida Blue which performed from 2001 to 2004, and reformed to record an album in 2018.

After a two-year hiatus from the music industry during Phish's hiatus, McConnell returned as a solo artist, recording an album of all new material in 2006. This eponymous album was released April 17, 2007 through Sony/BMG's Legacy Recordings. On signing with Legacy, McConnell has stated, "I know a lot of people on the internet, and that's certainly an option – especially these days and especially if you're catering to the Phish fans who already know who I am. But I wanted a little bit more than that... I was proud of the record, and I wanted as many people as possible to hear it when I was done with it."

McConnell headlined the High Sierra Music Festival in July 2007, which was held in Quincy, California. His touring band features multi-instrumentalist Jared Slomoff, guitarist Adam Zimmon, bassist Rob O'Dea, and drummer Gabe Jarrett. Said McConnell, "I have a really good feeling about this group. It feels like a band, although it's in its infancy right now. It really does feel like there is a collective consciousness."

From 2012 to 2015, McConnell toured on occasion with members of The Meters as The Meter Men.

Instruments
Page McConnell's current rig on Phish includes:
 a Hohner D6 Clavinet (running through a Whirlwind Orange Box phaser pedal and then to a Vox 847A wah-wah pedal and finally into a Fender Deluxe Reverb amp)
 a 1991 Yamaha C7 concert grand (7'6") piano (since 2.3.93) mic'ed with a Helpinstill model 280 piano pickup and Neuman KM184 microphones
 a Hammond B3 organ with a Leslie 122 speaker (modified with individual percussion and chorus output knobs for a more tuned effect)
 a 2019 Moog One 16 voice tri-timbral polyphonic synthesizer. The Moog One is the first polyphonic analog synthesizer from Moog in more than three decades
 a Wurlitzer model 200 electric piano with a custom blue sparkle top. Modified with a Warneck Research EP200 amplifier by Retrolinear The 200 replaced his Wurlitzer model 106P in 2019
 a Yamaha CS-60 polyphonic synthesizer
 a 1969 Fender Rhodes Silver Sparkle Top Suitcase 73 Model electric piano running through a vintage Maestro PS-1A Phase Shifter
 a Moog Liberation (since 2009; formerly owned by James Brown) when playing Edgar Winter's "Frankenstein" with Phish
 a Nord Stage 3 HP76 Digital stage piano with piano, organ, and synthesizer sound engines
 All keyboard audio outputs plug into Radial DI's before going to the FOH mix

Albums

Solo albums
 Page McConnell (April 17, 2007)
 Unsung Cities And Movies Never Made (April 20, 2013)
 Maybe We're the Visitors (April 9, 2021)

Vida Blue albums
 Vida Blue (June 25, 2002, Elektra)
 The Illustrated Band (October 14, 2003, Sanctuary)
 Crossing Lines (September 20, 2019, ATO Records)

Other albums
 December (with Trey Anastasio) (January 29, 2021)
 January (with Trey Anastasio) (March 10, 2023)

References

External links
 
 'The Art of Improvisation' – Page's senior study from Goddard College

1963 births
20th-century American keyboardists
American organists
American male organists
American rock pianists
American male pianists
Gill St. Bernard's School alumni
Goddard College alumni
Living people
Phish members
Musicians from New Jersey
Musicians from Philadelphia
People from Bernards Township, New Jersey
Southern Methodist University alumni
20th-century American pianists
21st-century American keyboardists
21st-century organists